The 1934–35 Kansas Jayhawks men's basketball team represented the University of Kansas during the 1934–35 college men's basketball season.

Roster
Gordon Gray
Ray Ebling
Lester Kappelman
Raymond Noble
Wilmer Shaffer
Al Wellhausen
Paul Rogers
Dick Wells
Milton Allen
Robert Oyler

Schedule

References

Kansas Jayhawks men's basketball seasons
Kansas
Kansas
Kansas